Kolbeckite (scandium phosphate dihydrate) is a mineral with formula: ScPO4·2H2O. It was discovered originally at Schmiedeberg, Saxony, Germany in 1926 and is named after Friedrich L. W. Kolbeck, a German mineralogist. Kolbeckite is usually found as small clusters of crystals associated with other phosphate minerals.

See also
List of minerals
List of minerals named after people

References

 
Kolbeckite at Mindat.org
 Kolbeckite at Webmineral

Scandium minerals
Phosphate minerals
Monoclinic minerals
Minerals in space group 14